The Girl from Leningrad is a 1941 Soviet adventure film directed by Viktor Eisymont.

Plot 
The film takes place during the Finnish war. A group of girls voluntarily go to the front. Young girls help doctors save the lives of wounded soldiers, and also fight with the enemy.

Starring 
 Zoya Fyodorova as Natasha
 Mariya Kapustina as Tamara
 Olga Fyodorina as The Cricket
 Tamara Alyoshina as Zina
 Yekaterina Melentyeva as Shura
 Andrei Abrikosov as Lt. Sergei Korovin
 Konstantin Adashevsky as Dr. Katner
 Yury Tolubeev as Maj. Braginsky
 Boris Blinov as Andrei Morosov

References

External links 
 

1941 films
1940s Russian-language films
Soviet adventure films
1941 adventure films
Soviet black-and-white films
Soviet World War II films